Calycadenia mollis is a species of flowering plant in the family Asteraceae known by the common name soft western rosinweed. It is native to a section of central California, from Tuolumne County do northern Tulare County. There are also isolated populations farther north in Nevada County. The plant grows in a number of habitat types in the Central Valley and adjacent Sierra Nevada foothills.

Calycadenia mollis is an annual herb producing an erect, hairy stem up to 90 centimeters tall. The leaves are linear in shape and up to 8 centimeters long, the longest ones often toward the middle of the stem. The inflorescence bears several long clusters of small, very glandular flower heads, each of which has one or more white, yellow, or red triple-lobed ray florets around a center of disc florets. The fruit is an achene; those arising from the disc florets have a pappus of about eight scales.

References

External links
Jepson Manual Treatment
USDA Plants Profile
Calphotos Photo gallery, University of California

mollis
Flora of California
Plants described in 1868